Rhinoblemma is a monotypic genus of  araneomorph spiders in the family Tetrablemmidae found on Caroline Island. It contains the single species, Rhinoblemma unicorne, first described in 1963 by Carl Friedrich Roewer under the name Tetrablemma unicornis. In 1981, Pekka T. Lehtinen transferred it to Rhinoblemma.

See also
 List of Tetrablemmidae species
Tetrablemma

References

Monotypic Araneomorphae genera
Spiders of Oceania
Taxa named by Pekka T. Lehtinen
Tetrablemmidae